Michael Griffith may refer to:

 Michael Griffith (cricketer) (born 1933), South African cricketer
 Michael Griffith (novelist), novelist and short-story writer
 Michael Griffith, victim of manslaughter in the 1986 Howard Beach racial incident
 Mike Griffith (cricketer) (born 1943), cricketer
 Mike Griffith (politician), Maryland state legislator
 Michael Griffith (trawler); see List of shipwrecks in 1953

See also

Michael Griffin (disambiguation)
Michael Griffiths (disambiguation)

Griffith, Michael